ETV+ is a Russian language free-to-air television channel operated by the Estonian Public Broadcasting. It was launched on 28 September 2015. The channel is aimed at Estonia's Russian-speaking minority airing both news and entertainment shows. The channel's budget in 2015 was 2.53 million euros.

From 2015 to 2018, Darja Saar was the chief editor of the channel.

From 2019, the editor-in-chief is Ekaterina Taklaja.

The ETV+ name was chosen out of 360 submissions in a competition to find a name for the new channel. According to ETV+ chief Darja Saar, the plus part of the name stems from the Russian words: 'п - популярное', 'лю - любимое' and 'с - своё' meaning 'popular', 'beloved' and 'ours' which together spell plus".

References

External links

Television channels in Estonia
Television channels and stations established in 2015
Mass media in Tallinn
Eesti Rahvusringhääling
2015 establishments in Estonia
Russian-language mass media in Estonia